Florina Pană (born January 20, 1973 in Bucharest) is a now retired female long-distance runner from Romania. She set her personal best (2:30:23) in the women's marathon on April 18, 1999 in Bordeaux, France.

Achievements

References

1973 births
Living people
Romanian female long-distance runners
Sportspeople from Bucharest